RNA-binding protein 5 is a protein that in humans is encoded by the RBM5 gene.

References

Further reading

External links